The Communauté d'agglomération Bourges Plus is the communauté d'agglomération, an intercommunal structure, centred on the city of Bourges. It is located in the Cher department, in the Centre-Val de Loire region, central France. It was created 21 October 2002. Its area is 417.3 km2. Its population was 102,679 in 2018, of which 64,668 in Bourges proper.

Composition
The communauté d'agglomération consists of the following 17 communes:

Annoix
Arçay
Berry-Bouy
Bourges
La Chapelle-Saint-Ursin
Le Subdray
Lissay-Lochy
Marmagne
Mehun-sur-Yèvre
Morthomiers
Plaimpied-Givaudins
Saint-Doulchard
Saint-Germain-du-Puy
Saint-Just
Saint-Michel-de-Volangis
Trouy
Vorly

References 

Bourges Plus
Bourges